Richard's worm snake (Antillotyphlops richardi) is a species of snake in the family Typhlopidae.

Etymology
The specific name, richardi, is in honor of either of two French Botanists, Louis Claude Marie Richard or his son Achille Richard.

Geographic range
It is endemic to the Caribbean, where it is found on Anegada in the British Virgin Islands, on the Turks and Caicos Islands, and on the United States Virgin Islands.

References

Further reading
Duméril A-M-C, Bibron G (1844). Erpétologie générale ou Histoire naturelle complète des Reptiles, Tome sixième [Volume 6]. Paris: Roret. xii + 609 pp. (Typhlops richardii, new species, pp. 290–293). (in French).
Hedges SB, Marion AB, Lipp KM, Marin J, Vidal N (2014). "A taxonomic framework for typhlopid snakes from the Caribbean and other regions (Reptilia, Squamata)". Caribbean Herpetology (49): 1-61. (Antillotyphlops richardi, new combination).
Schwartz A, Thomas R (1975). A Check-list of West Indian Amphibians and Reptiles. Carnegie Museum of Natural History Special Publication No. 1. Pittsburgh, Pennsylvania: Carnegie Museum of Natural History. 216 pp. (Typhlops richardi, p. 199).

Antillotyphlops
Reptiles of the United States Virgin Islands
Reptiles described in 1844
Taxa named by André Marie Constant Duméril
Taxa named by Gabriel Bibron
Taxobox binomials not recognized by IUCN